Landmarc Films is a film production company founded by  Vidhi Kasliwal. The company's headquarters are located in Mumbai, India.

Landmarc Films is a division of Landmarc Leisure Corporation Limited [LLCL].

Productions

Documentaries
Block by Block (2011)
Memories of Prem Ratan Dhan Payo (2015)
Building For The Future (2013)
That's What It's All About (2017)
Vidyoday (2018)

Marathi films
Sanngto Aika (2014)
Vazandar (2016)
Ringan (2017)
Gachchi (2017)
Redu (2017)
Pipsi (2018)
Nashibvaan (2019)

References

External links
 Landmarc Films Official website

Film production companies based in Mumbai
Film distributors of India
Hindi cinema